Northern Khmer people or colloquially as Thais of Khmer origin is the designation used to refer to ethnic Khmers native to the Isan region of Northeast Thailand.

History
Khmers have had a presence in this area since at least the time of the Khmer Empire. With the fall of the Angkor, the Khmers of the Isan region were subject to increasing Thai influence. In the 18th century, the Thai kingdom officially annexed the former Cambodian province of Surin. The Khmer residents became de facto subjects of the Thai monarchy and a long process of gradual cultural assimilation began.

Demographics

Culture
Although now a minority, the Northern Khmer have maintained some of their Khmer identity, practicing the Khmer form of Theravada Buddhism and speaking a dialect known as Khmê in Khmer and Northern Khmer in English. Few Northern Khmers are able to read or write their native language, since teaching in public schools is exclusively in Thai.

The Thai language instruction has resulted in many of the younger generation being more comfortable using Thai as a medium of communication. In 1998, Smalley reported renewed interest in Khmer language and culture had resulted in a two-fold increase in the use of Northern Khmer since 1958. However, usage of Khmer has subsequently declined.

In the past two decades, there has been state-directed revitalization of 'local' cultures in Thailand, including of Khmer culture, which has been challenged for adopting a state narrative and insufficiently empowering the Northern Khmer themselves.

Conflict
Although it is not anywhere near the scale of the protests of the Khmer Krom in the Mekong Delta Vietnam, some Northern Khmers living in the Isan region have demanded more rights and oppose Thaification of the Surin Khmer. Also, the occasional hostilities between Thailand and Cambodia have made their relations sometimes difficult.

Notable Northern Khmers
 Suvadhana — Princess Consort to the King Vajiravudh of Siam. (Khmer descent from Battambang)
 Bejaratana — Princess of Thailand. (Khmer descent from Battambang)
 Khuang Abhaiwongse — 4th Prime Minister of Thailand.  (Khmer descent from Battambang)
  (Surachai Chanthimathorn) — The lead vocalist and songwriter of the band Caravan.  (Northern Khmer descent from Surin)
 Chai Chidchob - Former President of the National Assembly of Thailand and Speaker of the House of Representatives
 Newin Chidchop - an influential modern Thai political figure of Northern Khmer ancestry
 Siroch Chatthong – Thai footballer of Khmer origin from Battambang

See also 
 Kuy people

References

External links
Thailand’s Khmer as ‘Invisible Minority’: Language, Ethnicity and Cultural Politics in North-Eastern Thailand
Kandrum (Kantreum) Folk Performers
Ethnic Khmer Festival in Thailand
Thai-Cambodia fighting disrupts border ties
Puangthong Rungswasdisab, Thailand's Response to the Cambodian Genocide; insights on Thailand's foreign policy towards its neighboring countries
World Directory of Minorities - Mon and Khmer

Ethnic groups in Thailand